The Apparition is an internationally co-produced drama film, directed by Xavier Giannoli, from a screenplay by Giannoli, Jacques Fieschi and Marcia Romano. It stars Vincent Lindon, Galatéa Bellugi, Patrick d'Assumçao, Elina Löwensohn, Gérard Dessalles, Bruno Georis and Claude Lévêque.

It was released in France on 14 February 2018, by Memento Films.

Cast
 Vincent Lindon as Jacques Mayano
 Galatéa Bellugi as Anna
 Patrick d'Assumçao as Pére Borrodine
 Elina Löwensohn as Docteur de Villeneuve
 Gérard Dessalles as Stéphane Mornay
 Bruno Georis as Pére Ezéradot
 Claude Lévêque as Pére Gallois
 Anatole Taubman as Anton Meyer
 Alicia Hava as Mériem

Production
In January 2017, it was announced Vincent Lindon, Galatéa Bellugi and Patrick d'Assumçao had joined the cast of the film, with Xavier Giannoli directing from a screenplay he wrote, alongside Jacques Fieschi and Marcia Romano.

Release
The film was released in France on 14 February 2018, by Memento Films. In February 2018, Music Box Films acquired U.S. distribution rights to the film. It was released in the United States on 7 September 2018.

Critical reception
The Apparition received positive reviews from film critics. The site's critical consensus reads, "The Apparition intrigues on a purely narrative level while also managing to tackle thorny questions of faith with suitably sober intelligence." On Metacritic, the film holds a rating of 64 out of 100, based on 9 critics, indicating "generally favorable reviews".

References

External links
 
 
 
 

2018 films
2018 drama films
2010s French-language films
English-language French films
English-language Belgian films
English-language Jordanian films
French drama films
Belgian drama films
Jordanian drama films
Films about Catholicism
Films about Christianity
Films about journalists
Films directed by Xavier Giannoli
2010s French films